Pachyglobolaelaps is a genus of mites in the family Pachylaelapidae. This genus has a single species, Pachyglobolaelaps hallidayi.

References

Acari